Venezuelan Americans ( or ) are Americans who trace their heritage, or part of their heritage, to the nation of Venezuela. The word may refer to someone born in the U.S. of Venezuelan descent or to someone who has immigrated to the U.S. from Venezuela.

Venezuelan Americans are one of 20 Latin American groups in the United States. Venezuela's diverse culture includes influences from Spanish, Portuguese, Italians, Germans, and the French, along with influences from African and Amerindian elements.

Venezuelan Spanish is the group's spoken form of the Spanish language.

In the United States, Venezuelans are on top of the list of nationalities requesting asylum.

History 
Until the 20th century, the number of Venezuelans that immigrated to the United States is unknown because they were included in the "Other" category. During the eighteenth and nineteenth centuries, there were many European migrants who went originally to Venezuela, but later moved to the United States with their children and grandchildren who were born and/or grew up in Venezuela speaking Spanish. From 1910 to 1930, it is estimated that over 4,000 South Americans each year migrated to the United States. However, there are not many specific figures that indicate the number of Venezuelans among the 4,000.

Many Venezuelans settled in the United States with hopes of receiving a better education, only to remain there following graduation. Many Venezuelans who have relatives living in the United States also immigrated to this country. However, since the 1980s, the reasons for Venezuelan immigration have changed to include hopes of earning a better salary. In the 1990s and continuing up to the present, many Venezuelans opposing the regime of presidents Hugo Chavez and Nicolás Maduro have migrated to the United States (mostly to Florida, but New York City and Los Angeles are other destinations).

Demographics 

The largest concentration of Venezuelans in the United States is in South Florida, especially the Miami suburbs of Doral and Weston. Other main states with Venezuelan American populations are, according to the 2010 census, Texas, New York, California, New Jersey, Georgia and Virginia. Urban areas with a large Venezuelan community include Miami, Houston, New York City, Los Angeles, and Washington, D.C.

U.S. metropolitan areas with the largest Venezuelan populations
The largest populations of Venezuelans are situated in the following metropolitan areas (Source: 2019 estimate):
 Miami-Fort Lauderdale-West Palm Beach, FL MSA - 122,506 - 2.01%
 Orlando-Kissimmee-Sanford, FL MSA – 35,000 - 1.40%
 Houston-Sugar Land-Baytown, TX MSA – 27,632 - 0.40%
 New York-Northern New Jersey-Long Island, NY-NJ-PA-CT MSA – 20,832 - 0.11%
 Tampa-St. Petersburg-Clearwater, FL MSA – 11,444 - 0.37%
 Atlanta-Sandy Springs-Marietta, GA MSA – 10,104 - 0.17%
 Dallas–Fort Worth-Arlington, TX MSA - 8,375 - 0.11%
 Washington-Arlington-Alexandria, DC-VA-MD-WV MSA – 7,012 - 0.11%
 Los Angeles-Long Beach-Santa Ana, CA MSA – 5,174 - 0.04%
 Boston-Cambridge-Newton, MA-NH Metro Area - 4,273 - 0.08%
 Chicago-Joliet-Naperville, IL-IN-WI MSA - 4,027 - 0.04%
  Salt Lake City, UT MSA - 3,067 - 0.26%
  Jacksonville, FL-GA MSA - 3,057 - 0.20%
 Philadelphia-Camden-Wilmington, PA-NJ-DE-MD MSA - 2,496 - 0.04%
 Charlotte-Gastonia-Rock Hill, NC-SC MSA - 2,445 - 0.09%
 Austin-Round Rock-Georgetown, TX MSA - 2,381 - 0.11%
 San Francisco-Oakland-Fremont, CA MSA - 2,256 - 0.05%
 Denver-Aurora-Lakewood, CO MSA - 2,024 - 0.07%

States with highest Venezuelan population

The 10 states with the largest Venezuelan population were (Source: Census 2010):
Florida – 102,116 (0.5% of state population)
Texas – 20,162 (0.1% of state population)
New York – 13,910 (0.1% of state population)
California – 11,100 (less than 0.1% of state population)
New Jersey – 6,950 (0.1% of state population)
Georgia – 6,289 (0.1% of state population)
Virginia – 4,429 (0.1% of state population)
North Carolina – 4,070 (less than 0.1% of state population)
Massachusetts – 3,982 (0.1% of state population)
Maryland – 3,328 (0.1% of state population)

Population distribution by Venezuelan ancestry
Among U.S. communities in 2000 wherein one thousand or more people indicated their ancestry, those where at least 1% of people claimed Venezuelan ancestry were:

 Doral, Florida 8.22%
 Weston, Florida 4.1%
 Fontainebleau, Florida 3.14%
 The Hammocks, Florida 3.14%
 Key Biscayne, Florida 2.36%
 North Bay Village, Florida 2.15%
 Sunny Isles Beach, Florida 1.96%
 Miami Beach, Florida 1.79%
 Virginia Gardens, Florida 1.58%
 Kendale Lakes, Florida 1.54%
 Kendall, Florida 1.47%
 Surfside, Florida 1.41%
 Richmond West, Florida 1.36%
 West Sand Lake, New York 1.34%
 Aventura, Florida 1.31%
 Country Club, Florida 1.26%
 Bal Harbour, Florida 1.21%
 Coral Gables, Florida 1.17%
 Bay Harbor Islands, Florida 1.15%
 Miami Lakes, Florida 1.06%
 Tamiami, Florida 1.06%
 Miami Springs, Florida 1.01%
 Sand Lake, New York 1.01%

By Venezuelan birth
The top 25 U.S. communities with the most residents born in Venezuela are:

 Doral, Florida 17.3%
 Medley, Florida 16.1%
 Weston, Florida 10.2%
 Maurice, Louisiana 9.8%
 Hunters Creek, Florida 7.1%
 Three Lakes, Florida 5.1%
 North Westside, Florida 5.0%
 Northlake, Texas 4.8%
 Key Biscayne, Florida 4.3%
 Aventura, Florida 4.2%
 Dade City North, Florida 4.0%
 Southchase, Florida 3.7%
 Lake Belvedere Estates, Florida 3.7%
 Fontainebleau, Florida 3.5%
 Wahneta, Florida 3.5%
 Derwood, Maryland 3.3%
 North Bay Village, Florida 3.3%
 Princeton, Florida 3.1%
 The Hammocks, Florida 3.0%
 Chambers Estates, Florida 2.8%
 Snellville, Georgia 2.8%
 Tequesta, Florida 2.8%
 Horizon West, Florida 2.7%
 Sunny Isles Beach, Florida 2.4%
 Surfside, Florida 2.4%

Ethnic variety 
The Venezuelan American population represents Venezuela's ethnic variety. Some 40 percent of Venezuelan immigrants are a mixture of European, Amerindian, and African ancestry. The rest are 56 percent white, 2 percent black and 2 percent is Amerindian. Most Venezuelan Americans are descendants of Spanish (mainly), Italians, Portuguese, Germans, Jews, Syrians and Chinese.

Socioeconomics 

The Venezuelan American population are highly educated. The people obtain bachelor's, graduate, and professional degrees at nearly double (48.5%) the total U.S. national percentage (27%), while only 6% of the group's adults did not complete high school, compared to 15.9% of the total U.S. national population.
Venezuelan Americans are not only highly adapted to the English language and achieve great accomplishments in American education, but also tend to consider the teaching and preservation of the Spanish language a priority for the most part. Thus, they teach the language to their children.  And emphasize the extreme importance of obtaining a level of academic achievement and/or technical acumen for their own children.

Venezuelan Americans work in a variety of professions. However, many of them are inclined to banking and the petroleum industry. Thus, they often have a significantly deep depth of expertise within these specific professions. Venezuelan Americans also work in highlighted positions in the television, publishing, and radio industries. In addition, many Venezuelan Americans are becoming politicians or entering some form of public service within government, working in both local and federal politics. Furthermore, there is a significant growth in the number of Venezuelan Americans that engage in the public arena of politics specifically at the federal level, going so far as proactively submitting for electoral consideration for those federal public positions. In general, most commonly Venezuelan American citizens will often engage heavily and overtly in U.S. politics, and the politics of their native country, and are often extremely well informed and a few among their number are astute near-consistent life-long polymath students of history, language, science, culture, and economics.  

They will often be very aware of specific political policies, local, state, and federal laws, and the history of where those policies and laws come from.  The attitude among these few Venezuelan Americans is that there is no shame in not knowing something, but to be content and complicit in not knowing is something to be truly ashamed of.  So they will often instead view the lack or absence of knowing something as an opportunity to proactively engage in a deep self-study on a particular subject to be better suited and far capable to speak to that subject the next time they engage in a discussion on that same subject.

Relations with Venezuela 

Venezuelan Americans still maintain strong relations with their country of origin, which can easily be seen in business, family, and community life. Venezuelan Americans often report on the social and current events in Venezuela and first-generation immigrants visit there frequently. It is also quite common for Venezuelans to visit their relatives in the United States.

Notable people

See also

Venezuelan diaspora
United States–Venezuela relations

References

Further reading
 O’Neil, Shannon K. "A Venezuelan Refugee Crisis." (2018). online
 Walker, Drew. "Venezuelan Americans." Gale Encyclopedia of Multicultural America, edited by Thomas Riggs, (3rd ed., vol. 4, Gale, 2014), pp. 485–497. online

External links
  The Venezuelan American Endowment for the Arts (VAEA)

+
Hispanic and Latino American